Carter Family was a traditional American folk music group that recorded between 1927 and 1956. Their music had a profound impact on bluegrass, country, Southern Gospel, pop and rock musicians as well as on the U.S. folk revival of the 1960s.

They were the first vocal group to become country music stars, and were among the first groups to record commercially produced country music. Their first recordings were made in Bristol, Tennessee, for the Victor Talking Machine Company  under producer Ralph Peer on August 1, 1927, the day before country singer Jimmie Rodgers also made his initial recordings for Victor under Peer. Their recordings of songs such as "Wabash Cannonball", "Can the Circle Be Unbroken", "Wildwood Flower", "Keep On the Sunny Side" and "I'm Thinking Tonight of My Blue Eyes" made these songs country standards. The tune of the last was used for Roy Acuff's "The Great Speckled Bird", Hank Thompson's "The Wild Side of Life" and Kitty Wells' "It Wasn't God Who Made Honky Tonk Angels", making the song a hit all over again in other incarnations.

The original group consisted of  Sara Carter, her husband A.P. Carter, and her sister-in-law Maybelle Carter. Maybelle was married to A.P.'s brother Ezra Carter (Eck) and was also Sara's first cousin. All three were born and raised in southwest Virginia, where they were immersed in the tight harmonies of mountain gospel music and shape note singing.

Throughout the group's career, Sara Carter sang lead vocals and played rhythm guitar or autoharp, and  Maybelle sang harmony and played lead guitar. On some songs A.P. did not perform at all; on some songs he sang harmony and background vocals and occasionally he sang lead. Maybelle's distinctive guitar-playing style became a hallmark of the group, and her Carter Scratch (a method for playing both lead and rhythm on the guitar) has become one of the most copied styles of guitar playing. The group (in all its incarnations, see below) recorded for a number of companies, including RCA Victor, ARC group, Columbia, Okeh and various imprint labels.

History

The Carter Family made their first recordings on August 1, 1927. The previous day, A.P. Carter had persuaded his wife Sara Carter and his sister-in-law Maybelle Carter to make the journey from Maces Spring, Virginia, to Bristol, Tennessee, to audition for record producer Ralph Peer. Peer was seeking new talent for the relatively embryonic recording industry. The initial sessions are part of what are now called the Bristol Sessions. The band received $50 for each song recorded, plus a half-cent royalty on every copy sold of each song for which they had registered a copyright. On November 4, 1927, the Victor Talking Machine Company (later RCA Victor) released a double-sided 78 rpm record of the group performing "Wandering Boy" and "Poor Orphan Child".  On December 2, 1928, Victor released "The Storms Are on the Ocean" / "Single Girl, Married Girl", which became very popular.

By the end of 1930, they had sold 300,000 records in the United States. Realizing that he would benefit financially with each new song he collected and copyrighted, A.P. traveled around the southwestern Virginia area in search of new songs; he also composed new songs. In the early 1930s, he befriended Lesley "Esley" Riddle, a black guitar player from Kingsport, Tennessee. Lesley accompanied A.P. on his song-collecting trips. In June 1931, the Carters did a recording session in Benton, Kentucky, along with Jimmie Rodgers. In 1933, Maybelle met the Speer Family at a fair in Ceredo, West Virginia, fell in love with their signature sound, and asked them to tour with the Carter Family.

Second generation

In the winter of 1938–39, the Carter Family traveled to Texas, where they had a twice-daily program on the border radio station XERA (later XERF) in Villa Acuña (now Ciudad Acuña, Mexico), across the border from Del Rio, Texas. In the 1939–40 season the children of A.P. and Sara (Janette Carter, Joe Carter) and those of Maybelle (Helen Carter, June Carter, Anita Carter) joined the group for radio performances, now in San Antonio, Texas, where the programs were prerecorded and distributed to multiple border radio stations. (The children did not, however, perform on the group's records.) In the fall of 1942, the Carters moved their program to WBT radio in Charlotte, North Carolina, for a one-year contract. They occupied the sunrise slot, with the program airing between 5:15 and 6:15 a.m.

By 1936, A.P. and Sara's marriage had dissolved. Sara married A.P.'s cousin, Coy Bayes, and moved to California, and the group disbanded in 1944.

Maybelle continued to perform with her daughters Anita Carter, June Carter, and Helen Carter and recorded on 3 labels (RCA Victor, Columbia and Coronet) as  "The Carter Sisters and Mother Maybelle" (sometimes billed as "The Carter Sisters" or "Maybelle Carter and the Carter Sisters" or "Mother Maybelle and the Carter Sisters"). In 1943, Maybelle Carter and her daughters, using the name "the Carter Sisters and Mother Maybelle" had a program on WRNL in Richmond, Virginia. Maybelle's brother, Hugh Jack (Doc) Addington Jr., and Carl McConnell, known as the Original Virginia Boys, also played music and sang on the radio show.

Chet Atkins joined them playing electric guitar in 1949 at WNOX radio in Knoxville, Tennessee and then moved with them in Oct. of 1949 to KWTO radio in Springfield, Missouri. Opry management didn't want the Carters to bring Chet with them when they were offered a regular spot on the Grand Ole Opry but Ezra (their father and manager) insisted that Chet come with them as he was a part of their troupe or band now. Finally the Opry management agreed and Chet went with them when they were hired by WSM and the Grand Ole Opry with their first day being May 29, 1950. Chester worked with them when they did "personals" off and on for 8 years but mostly on the live Grand Ole Opry performances.
A.P., Sara, and their children Joe and Janette recorded 3 albums in the 1950s under the name of The A.P. Carter Family. Mother Maybelle Carter and the Carter Sisters began using the name "the Carter Family" after the death of A.P. Carter in 1960 for their act during the 1960s and 1970s. Maybelle and Sara briefly reunited, recorded a reunion album (An Historic Reunion), and toured in the 1960s during the height of folk music's popularity.

A documentary about the family, Sunny Side of Life, was released in 1985.

In 1987, reunited sisters June Carter Cash and Helen and Anita Carter, along with June's daughter Carlene Carter, appeared as the Carter Family and were featured on a 1987 television episode of Austin City Limits along with June's husband Johnny Cash.

Third generation 
The Carter Family name was revived for a third time, under the name Carter Family III. A project of descendants of the original Carter Family, John Carter Cash (grandson of Maybelle Carter, son of June Carter Cash and Johnny Cash) and Dale Jett (grandson of A.P. and Sara Carter) along with John's then-wife Laura (Weber) Cash. They released their first album, Past & Present, in 2010.

Rosie Nix Adams, daughter of June Carter Cash, was also a semi-regular performing member of the Carter Family.

Third Generation family member Carlene Carter (granddaughter of Maybelle Carter) had for some time ventured into pop music when she became part of the 1987 Carter Family's second generation revival.

Personnel
A. P. Carter (1927–1944, 1952–1956)
Maybelle Carter (1927–1978)
Sara Carter (1927–1944, 1952–1956, 1960–1971)
Janette Carter (1939–1940, 1952–1956)
Helen Carter (1939–1940, 1944–1996)
June Carter Cash (1939–1940, 1944–1969, 1971–1996)
Anita Carter (1939–1940, 1944–1996)
Joe Carter (1952–1956)
John Carter Cash (2012–present)
Dale Jett (2012–present)
Carlene Carter (1987–present)
Laura Cash (2012–2016)

Extended family
June Carter and her sisters were distant cousins of U.S. President Jimmy Carter.

This family tree shows the extended Carter family back four generations.

Notes:

Legacy and musical style
As important to country music as the family's repertoire of songs was Maybelle's guitar playing. She developed her innovative guitar technique largely in isolation; her style is today widely known as the "Carter scratch" or "Carter Family picking". While Maybelle did use a flatpick on occasion, her major method of guitar playing was the use of her thumb (with a thumbpick) along with one or two fingers. What her guitar style accomplished was to allow her to play melody lines (on the low strings of the guitar) while still maintaining rhythm using her fingers, brushing across the higher strings.

Before the Carter family's recordings, the guitar was rarely used as a lead or solo instrument among white musicians. Maybelle's interweaving of a melodic line on the bass strings with intermittent strums is now a staple of steel string guitar technique. Flatpickers such as Doc Watson, Clarence White and Norman Blake took flatpicking to a higher technical level, but all acknowledge Maybelle's playing as their inspiration.

The Carter Family was elected to the Country Music Hall of Fame in 1970 and were given the nickname "The First Family of Country Music".
In 1988, the Carter Family was inducted into the Grammy Hall of Fame and received its Award for the song "Will the Circle Be Unbroken". In 1993, the U.S. Postal Service issued a commemorative postage stamp honoring A.P., Sara, and Maybelle. In 2001, the group was inducted into the International Bluegrass Music Hall of Honor. In 2005, the group received the Grammy Lifetime Achievement Award.

Renewed attention to the Carter Family tune "When I'm Gone" occurred after several covers performed a cappella with a cup used to provide percussion, as in the cup game and dubbed "Cups or The Cup Song", went viral and culminated with a short performance in the movie Pitch Perfect. Afterwards it was released as a single by Anna Kendrick.

The A.P. and Sara Carter House, A.P. Carter Homeplace, A.P. Carter Store, Maybelle and Ezra Carter House, and Mt. Vernon Methodist Church are listed on the National Register of Historic Places as components of the Carter Family Thematic Resource.

In 2017, the Carter Family's story was told in the award-winning documentary series American Epic. The film featured unseen film footage of The Carter Family performing and being interviewed, and radically improved restorations of their 1920s recordings. Director Bernard MacMahon commented that "we first came to the Carters through their records, but one of the other things that struck us about them is that they were involved in both of the main waves of America hearing itself for the first time. They made their first impact in that early wave of rural recordings, and then the next stage was the arrival of radio, and in the late 1930s, they went to Texas and were on XERA, a border station based in Mexico that could be heard all over the central and western United States." The Carter Family's story was profiled in the accompanying book, American Epic: The First Time America Heard Itself.

Discography

Selected 78 rpm records:
The Carter Family's career predated any sort of best-selling chart of country music records. (Billboard did not have a country best sellers chart until 1944.) Below is a select list of their 78 rpm releases.

References

Sources
 
Among My Klediments,  June Carter Cash, Grand Rapids, MI, Zondervan, 1979. 
In the Country of Country: A Journey to the Roots of American Music, Nicholas Dawidoff, Vintage Books, 1998. 
Will You Miss Me When I'm Gone?: The Carter Family and Their Legacy in American Music,  Mark Zwonitzer with Charles Hirshberg, New York, Simon & Schuster, 2002

External links

Country Music's First Family
The Carter Family Memorial Music Center, Inc.
The Carter Family Complete Song Texts
Carter Family Fold, Hiltons, Virginia
The Carter Family Discography
The Carter Family: Will the Circle be Unbroken
 Carter Family recordings at the Discography of American Historical Recordings.

American country music groups
Country Music Hall of Fame inductees
Grammy Lifetime Achievement Award winners
Liberty Records artists
Musical groups established in 1927
Musical groups disestablished in 1956
Virginia culture
Vocalion Records artists
Family musical groups
Johnny Cash
 
Musical groups from Virginia
Musical groups from Appalachia
American folk singers
1927 establishments in Virginia
1956 disestablishments in Virginia
Victor Records artists
RCA Victor artists
Banner Records artists